Kolone may refer to:
Kolone (Messenia), a town of ancient Messenia, Greece
Jeremiah Kolone (born 1994), Samoan-American football player
Va'ai Kolone (1911 – 2001), Prime Minister of Samoa